Parker Pannell is an American actor, YouTuber, and social media personality who is best known for his TikTok account, where he primarily posts comedy vlogs and skits.

Life and career
Pannell was raised in the Lexington, Kentucky area. He attended Lexington Christian Academy. At age 14 in 2018, Pannell moved to Los Angeles to pursue a career in the entertainment industry. He continued his schooling online while also taking acting, comedy, and hosting classes in Los Angeles. Pannell initially began making YouTube videos after his arrival in L.A. but found a larger audience on TikTok. By October 2019, he had a following of 779,000 on that app. He was also filming and starring in his own web series, Parker's Playground. As of December 2021, he had 2.6 million followers on TikTok.

As an actor, he has a recurring role on the Nickelodeon comedy series Warped!.

Filmography

References

External links
Official Website
 

Year of birth missing (living people)
Living people
American YouTubers
People from Lexington, Kentucky
Date of birth missing (living people)